Baron Pieter Melvill van Carnbee (20 May 1816, in The Hague – 24 October 1856, in Batavia) was a Dutch geographer.

Life
Melvill van Carnbee traced his descent from an old Scottish family, originally, it is said, of Hungarian extraction. Destined for the navy, in which his grandfather Pieter Melvill van Carnbee (1743–1810) had been admiral, he had a taste for hydrography and cartography as a student in the college of Medemblik, and he showed his capacity as a surveyor on his first voyage to the Dutch Indies, in 1835. In 1839, he was again in the East, and was attached to the hydrographical bureau at Batavia. With the assistance of documents collected by the old East India Company, he completed a map of Java in five sheets, accompanied by sailing directions, in Amsterdam, in 1842. He remained in the East until 1845, collecting materials for a chart of the waters between Sumatra and Borneo, which was two sheets that were published in 1845 and 1846. In his absence, Melvill received the decoration of the Netherlands Lion in 1843, and that of the Legion of Honour in 1849.

On his return to the Netherlands he was attached to the naval department with the charge of studying the history of the hydrography of the Dutch East Indies. He also undertook, in connexion with P. F. von Siebold, the publication of the Moniteur des Indes, a valuable series of scientific papers, mainly from his own pen, on the foreign possessions of the Netherlands, which was continued for three years. In 1850, Melvill returned to India as lieutenant of the first class and adjutant to Vice-Admiral van den Bosch; and after the premature death of this commander he was again appointed keeper of the charts at Batavia. In 1853, he obtained exemption from active naval service that he might devote himself to a general atlas of the Dutch Indies. But, in 1856, he fell a victim to climate, dying at Batavia. In spite of delays in engraving, twenty-five sheets of the atlas were already finished, but it was not until 1862 that the whole plan, embracing sixty sheets, was completed by Lieutenant Colonel W. F. Versteeg.

In 1843 Melvill received the decoration of the Netherlands Lion, and in 1849 that of the Légion d'honneur.

References

1816 births
1856 deaths
Dutch geographers
Dutch people of Scottish descent
Scientists from The Hague
Pieter